Anna Benjamin David is an American publisher, author, speaker, podcast host, and television personality.

Early life
David was born to Jewish parents. She is a graduate of Trinity College.

Career

Book and magazine author
David is the author of the novels Party Girl (HarperCollins, 2007), Bought (HarperCollins, 2009), and the non-fiction books Falling For Me (HarperCollins, 2011), Reality Matters (HarperCollins, 2010), True Tales of Lust and Love, How to Get Successful by F*cking Up Your Life and Make Your Mess Your Memoir. Her book By Some Miracle I Made It Out of There, co-written with Tom Sizemore, was a New York Times bestseller.  In 2021, she got the rights to Party Girl back from HarperCollins and relaunched the book under her own publishing imprint. Party Girl is in development as a movie with the producer of Martin Scorsese's The Irishman  and the comedian and Curb Your Enthusiasm star Jeff Garlin.

David has been a contributor to The Daily Beast, Details, Maxim, Premiere, Parenting, People, Us Weekly, Time, MindBodyGreen, MarieClaire, BuzzFeed, and Razor.

David's work has appeared in The New York Times, The LA Times, Details, Cosmopolitan,  Time, Vice, BuzzFeed, Psychology Today, HuffPost, New York Post, The Huffington Post, Playboy, Redbook, Self, Stuff, TV Guide, Movieline, Women's Health, Esquire UK, Teen Vogue, Variety, Tatler, Emmy, and Salon.

Television personality
David was one of the main hosts on G4’s Attack of the Show for four years and has been featured on Good Morning America, The Talk, Hannity, Red Eye, Dr. Drew, Jane Velez Mitchell and The Insider as well as on various other programs on Fox News, CTV, MTV News, VH1 and E!.

In 2010, David started speaking at colleges about addiction and recovery. That year, she began delivering the keynote speech “Surviving and Thriving in an Addictive Society” at colleges across the country. In 2017, she gave her 10-minute talk, “How to Wear Your Labels” alongside Tony Robbins at the Genius Network Annual event. In 2018, she spoke at TEDxOhlone, TEDxLosGatos and TedXUniversityofSanDiego.

Legacy Launch Pad Publishing 
In 2017, David launched Legacy Launch Pad Publishing, a company that publishes books for entrepreneurs and thought leaders. Legacy Launch Pad has released numerous books that have become Wall Street Journal and USA Today bestsellers.

David hosts a podcast on publishing, which has been named one of the best publishing podcasts by LA Weekly and Feedspot, among many others. The podcast has featured interviews with Chris Voss, Adam Carolla, and Jay Abraham, and many more. Lastly, David is the book critic for KATU Portland's morning show.

Bibliography
 Party Girl (HarperCollins, 2007)
 Bought (HarperCollins, 2009)
 Reality Matters (HarperCollins, 2010)
 Falling For Me (HarperCollins, 2011)
 Animal Attraction (2012)
 By Some Miracle I Made It Out of There (Simon & Schuster, 2013)
 They Like Me They Really Like Me (2013) (audio version, 2015)
 True Tales of Lust and Love (Counterpoint/Soft Skull, 2014)
 Make Your Mess Your Message (Launch Pad Publishing, 2020)

References

External links

Bestselling Author In Recovery Helps A New Generation Of Recovery Writers Tell Their Stories on Huffington Post
How This NY Times Best-Selling Author Is Shifting The Addiction Narrative With Artful Storytelling - Forbes
You Could Be Building an Empire Without Even Realizing It - Entrepreneur
'Silence' Exec Producer Acquires Anna David Novel 'Party Girl' - Hollywood Reporter

Living people
American women journalists
American chick lit writers
Jewish American journalists
Jewish women writers
Trinity College (Connecticut) alumni
American women novelists
21st-century American non-fiction writers
21st-century American novelists
21st-century American women writers
Year of birth missing (living people)
21st-century American Jews